1 Boötis (1 Boo) is a binary star system in the northern constellation of Boötes, located 318 light years away from the Sun. It is visible to the naked eye as a dim, white-hued star with a combined apparent visual magnitude of 5.71. It is moving closer to the Earth with a heliocentric radial velocity of −26 km/s.

The magnitude 5.78 primary component is an A-type main-sequence star with a stellar classification of A1 V. This star has 2.5 times the mass of the Sun and is radiating 56 times the Sun's luminosity from its photosphere at an effective temperature of 9,863 K. It is 323 million years old and is spinning with a projected rotational velocity of 60 km/s.

The system is a source for X-ray emission, which is most likely coming from the companion star. This magnitude 9.60 component is a possible pre-main sequence star with a mass similar to the Sun. It is radiating 76% of the Sun's luminosity at an effective temperature of 6,370 K.

References

External links
 HR 5144
 CCDM J13407+1958
 Image 1 Boötis

A-type main-sequence stars
Double stars
Boötes
Durchmusterung objects
Bootis, 01
119055
066727
5144